The Judo at the 2017 European Youth Summer Olympic Festival contests were held at the Radnóti street Sport Centre in Győr, Hungary, from 25 to 28 July 2017.

Medalists
Source:

Boys

Girls

Medal table

References

External links
 

2017 European Youth Summer Olympic Festival
European Youth Summer Olympic Festival
2017
European 2017